Alessandro Fedeli (born 2 March 1996) is an Italian cyclist, who currently rides for UCI ProTeam .

Major results
2017
 1st Stage 4 Giro della Valle d'Aosta
 7th Trofeo Piva 
 7th Toscana Terra di Ciclismo Eroica 
 8th Gran Premio della Liberazione 
2018
 1st Trofeo Edil C
 1st Gran Premio della Liberazione
 1st Stage 3 Giro della Valle d'Aosta 
 5th GP Capodarco 
 7th G.P. Palio del Recioto
 7th Giro del Medio Brenta 
 8th Gran Premio Industrie del Marmo 
2019
 1st Stage 6 CRO Race
 1st Stage 1 Tour of Rwanda
2020 
 1st Stage 4 Tour du Limousin
 5th Bretagne Classic
 8th Memorial Marco Pantani
2022
 2nd Overall Tour of Antalya
 2nd GP Industria & Artigianato
 4th Per sempre Alfredo

References

External links

1996 births
Living people
Italian male cyclists
Cyclists from the Province of Verona